Glaucia Suelen Silva Cristiano (born 30 January 1993) is a Brazilian footballer who plays as an attacker for São Paulo.

Career

Before the 2012 season, Glaucia signed for South Korean side Red Angels. Before the 2013 season, she signed for  São Caetano in Brazil. Before the 2015 season, she signed for South Korean club Sejong Sportstoto. Before the 2016 season, Glaucia signed for São José in Brazil. Before the 2018 season, she signed for South Korean team Hwacheon KSPO. Before the 2019 season, she signed for Santos in Brazil.

Personal life
During her first unhappy spell in South Korea, Glaucia became overweight and depressed.

References

External links
 Glaucia at playmakerstats.com

1993 births
Living people
Associação Desportiva Centro Olímpico players
Women's association football forwards
Brazilian expatriate women's footballers
Brazilian expatriate sportspeople in South Korea
Brazilian women's footballers
Campeonato Brasileiro de Futebol Feminino Série A1 players
Expatriate women's footballers in South Korea
Incheon Hyundai Steel Red Angels WFC players
People from São Bernardo do Campo
Santos FC (women) players
São José Esporte Clube (women) players
São Paulo FC (women) players
WK League players